Miss Grand Belgium 2021 was the inaugural edition of the Miss Grand Belgium beauty pageant, held at the AED Studios in Lint, Belgium, on September 28, 2021. Eight candidates who qualified through the casting process competed for the title, of whom a nineteen-years-old India-born Tibetan decedent, Zomkey Tenzin, won the main title and then represented Belgium at the  pageant in Thailand, but she got a non-placement.

The event was hosted by Vincent De Koninck and Veronique De Kock-Goossens.

Result

Candidates
Eight candidates competed for the title of Miss Grand Belgium 2021.

  – Veronique Michielsen
  – Souad Lips
  – Aiona Santana
  – Tenzin Zomkey

  – Imaine Khoudairi
  – Thanaree Scheerlinck
  – Noor Beldjoudi
  – Laurine Remans

References

External links

 

Grand Belgium

2021 in Belgium